Leroy Bolden, Jr. (August 24, 1932 – October 31, 2008) was an American football halfback in the National Football League for the Cleveland Browns. He played college football for the Michigan State Spartans.

Early years
Bolden was born in Wabash, Arkansas, and attended Northern High School in Flint, Michigan, where he was an All-state halfback and contributed to the school winning a state championship in 1950. He also ran the 100 and 220-yard dash events on the track team, contributing to the school winning the state championship in 1949 and 1950.

College career
He played college football for Michigan State University from 1952 to 1954. As a member of the undefeated, national champion 1952 Michigan State Spartans football team, he gained 414 rushing yards on 53 carries, an average of 7.8 yards per carry.

The following year, he led the 1953 Spartans (#3 in the final AP Poll) with 691 rushing yards on 127 carries, an average of 5.4 yards per carry.  At the end of the 1953 season, Bolden was selected by the Associated Press as a first-team All-Big Ten player, and by the United Press as a second-team player on the 1953 College Football All-America Team.

In 1985, he was inducted into the Greater Flint Area Sports Hall of Fame. In 1989, he was inducted into the Greater Flint Afro-American Hall of Fame.

Professional career

Cleveland Browns
Bolden was selected by the Cleveland Browns in the sixth round (73rd overall) of the 1955 NFL Draft. He spent from 1955 to 1957 serving his military service.

He appeared in 23 games and gained 66 rushing yards on 19 carries for the Browns. He was used mostly as kickoff returner, registering 23 returns for 532 yards, including a 102-yard return for a touchdown in 1958.

Dallas Cowboys
Bolden was selected by the Dallas Cowboys in the 1960 NFL Expansion Draft and was released before the start of the season.

Personal life
After football, he worked for Encyclopædia Britannica and Hewlett-Packard. He also served as an assistant director of admissions for Stanford University's graduate business school.

References

External links
 Greater Flint Afro-American Hall of Fame profile

1932 births
2008 deaths
American football halfbacks
Cleveland Browns players
Michigan State Spartans football players
Hewlett-Packard people
Stanford University staff
People from Phillips County, Arkansas
Players of American football from Arkansas
Players of American football from Flint, Michigan
African-American players of American football
20th-century African-American sportspeople